The siege of Gdov was part of the Time of Troubles and an episode of the Ingrian War.

Prelude 
In 1613, the Swedes, who captured Novgorod, approached Gdov twice, but as a result of the sorties of the garrison and with the help of the Pskov, the siege was withdrawn. In July 1614, the Swedes managed to defeat the Russian army sent for the liberation of Novgorod in the Battle of Bronnitsy, after which they firmly captured the military initiative in the north-west of Russia.

Siege 
In August 1614, the main Swedish forces led by Evert Horn were concentrated at Gdov. On August 25, King Gustavus Adolphus also arrived. The defenders of Gdov managed to repel two attacks, in which the Swedes suffered serious losses. However, the situation of the besieged became increasingly critical. Swedish artillery and subversive mines systematically destroyed the fortress wall. When more than a quarter of it was destroyed, the garrison decided to agree to the surrender of the city with free departure to Pskov, where it subsequently took part in repulsing the Swedish siege.

References 

Gdov
Gdov
Gdov
17th century in Sweden
1610s in Sweden
1613 in Russia
1614 in Russia
Russia–Sweden military relations